Erechthias capnitis is a moth of the family Tineidae first described by Alfred Jefferis Turner in 1918. It is originally endemic to Norfolk Island but is recorded as having arrived in New Zealand by 1977.

References

Moths described in 1918
Erechthiinae
Moths of New Zealand
Moths of Australia
Taxa named by Edward Meyrick